Hypselognathus rostratus, also known as the knife-snouted pipefish is a species of marine fish belonging to the family Syngnathidae. This species can be found in very shallow coastal waters of southeastern Australia. Their habitat consists of sandy substrates, seagrass beds, and estuaries. Reproduction occurs through ovoviviparity in which the males brood eggs before giving live birth.

References

External links 

Hypselognathus rostratus at Fishbase
Hypselognathus rostratus at Fishes of Australia

Syngnathidae
Fish described in 1921